Alfredo de Jesús Gutiérrez Vital (born April 17, 1940) is a Colombian accordion player and singer famous for winning  the "Vallenato Legend Festival" three times (since then he is known as the King of Kings).

He was born in Palo Quemao, Colombia, and began playing accordion when he was four. In 1960 he started his professional career as a musician, but it was in 1968 when he consolidated his career when he got a deal with Codiscos record label and produced an album that gave him national acclaim.

He was part of the famous music group Los Corraleros de Majagual along with Lisandro Meza, Chico Cervantes, Cesar Castro and Calixto Ochoa. Among his musical repertoire are found hits like "Los Indios", "Los Novios", "Ojos Indios", "Ojos Verdes", "Anhelos" "Cabellos Cortos", "Cabellos Largos", "Capullito de Rosa", "Ay Elena"  "Festival en Guararé".

In 2000, Along with  Francisco "Pacho" Rada and others artists he starred in the documentary El Acordeón del Diablo from the German director Stefan Schwietert.

References

External links 
 

1940 births
Living people
Colombian accordionists
Vallenato musicians
21st-century accordionists